The Church of St Margaret is a Church of England parish church in Heveningham, Suffolk. The church is a grade I listed building.

History
The churches dates to the Medieval period. The chancel dates to the 14th century. The tower dates to the 15th century. The double hammerbeam nave roof dates to the early 16th century. The church was restored from 1847 to 1966.

On 7 December 1966, the church was designated a Grade I listed building.

Present day
St Margaret's is part of the Benefice of Heveningham with Ubbeston, Huntingfield and Cookley in the Archdeaconry of Suffolk of the Diocese of St Edmundsbury and Ipswich.

As the parish rejects the ordination of women, it receives alternative episcopal oversight from the Bishop of Richborough (currently Norman Banks).

Notable burials
 The church contains an oak tomb of Sir John Haveningham.
 Air Vice-Marshal Thomas Traill, senior RAF officer, is buried in the churchyard.
 Mary Shelton, suspected mistress of King Henry VIII, is buried in the churchyard.

References

External links
 A Church Near You entry

Heveningham
Heveningham
Heveningham